In ancient cosmologies, the Empyrean Heaven, or simply the Empyrean, was the place in the highest heaven, which was supposed to be occupied by the element of fire (or aether in Aristotle's natural philosophy). The word derives from the Medieval Latin empyreus, an adaptation of the Ancient Greek empyros, meaning "in or on the fire (pyr)".

The Empyrean was thus used as a name for the incorporeal "heaven of the first day", and in Christian literature for the dwelling-place of God, the blessed, celestial beings so divine they are made of pure light, and the source of light and creation. Notably, at the very end of Dante's Paradiso, Dante visits God in the Empyrean.

The word is used both as a noun and as an adjective, but empyreal is an alternate adjective form. The scientific words empyreuma and empyreumatic, applied to the characteristic smell of the burning or charring of vegetable or animal matter, have the same Greek origin.

See also
Atziluth
Central Fire
Heaven
Hyperuranion
Paradise
Pleroma
Seven Heavens
Third Heaven
Firmament

Sources

 Attribution
 

Early scientific cosmologies
Religious cosmologies
Christian cosmology
Conceptions of heaven